Matangi Tonga is an online newspaper providing Tongan news in both English and Tongan. It is operated by Vava'u Press. The newspaper's Nukualofa office was destroyed in the fires and rioting in November 2006.

References

External links
Matangi Tonga Online

Newspapers published in Tonga